Ruhbergia is a genus of velvet worms in the family Peripatopsidae. All species in this genus are ovoviviparous (with yolky ova) and have 15 pairs of legs in both sexes. They are found in New South Wales, Australia.

Species 
The genus contains the following species:

 Ruhbergia bifalcata Reid, 1996
 Ruhbergia brevicorna Reid, 1996
 Ruhbergia rostroides Reid, 1996

References 

Onychophorans of Australasia
Onychophoran genera
Taxa named by Amanda Reid (malacologist)